Exposure: Poisoned Water, Corporate Greed, and One Lawyer's Twenty-Year Battle against DuPont is the 2019 memoir by Robert Bilott, an American environmental attorney at Taft Stettinius & Hollister. The book follows Bilott’s personal and professional journey through the litigation surrounding the global crisis of persistent organic pollution due to PFOA and PFAS, referred to as "forever chemicals." For its contribution to broadening public awareness of sustainability, Exposure received the 2020 Green Prize for Sustainable Literature from the Santa Monica Public Library.

The book was published in the United States in 2019 by Atria Books/Simon & Schuster. It became available in hardcover on October 8, 2019, and in paperback on July 15, 2020. The audiobook version (also available through Atria Books) is narrated by Jeremy Bobb with the first chapter narrated by Mark Ruffalo, who plays Bilott in the movie Dark Waters. The book has also been published for the United Kingdom by Simon & Schuster UK, and has been translated into Chinese for its release on the Chinese market on November 28, 2022.

Reviews 
According to Nathaniel Rich, writer at large for The New York Times Magazine and author of Losing Earth: A Recent History, the book is "An intimate account of one of the most appalling environmental crimes in modern history. Exposure is a classic story of American good and American evil—of the triumph of ingenuity, diligence, and self-sacrifice over psychopathic corporate nihilism. Rob Bilott is a hero of our time."

Gary Rivlin in the New York Times Book Review called Exposure a "David and Goliath tale with a twist…. Bilott skillfully tells the story of his epic battle with DuPont."

"Leaves little doubt that year after year, the corporation misled government agencies, courts, and consumers into a false sense of security about the poisonous nature of their manufacturing processes." —Kirkus Reviews

The Law Library Journal says, "Exposure is an intriguing and easy-to-follow narrative that will have you up in arms about what might be in your drinking water. If you liked Erin Brockovich or A Civil Action, this book is a must-read.”

Related films 
Bilott's story inspired the 2019 motion picture Dark Waters starring Mark Ruffalo as Robert Bilott and was featured in the feature-length documentary The Devil We Know (2018).

References

Further reading

2019 non-fiction books
DuPont
Environmentalism in the United States
Atria Publishing Group books